Constance Carrier (July 29, 1908 – December 7, 1991) was an American teacher and poet.

Life
Carrier was descended from Martha Carrier, one of the women hanged during the notorious Salem witch trials of 1692. The witch trials were the subject of Carrier's last volume of poetry.

After graduating from Smith College in 1929, Carrier taught at New Britain High school, and then five years at Hall High School in West Hartford, before retiring in 1969. She taught several subjects, but is most remembered for teaching Latin.

Her work was published in the New Yorker, New York Quarterly, Ploughshares, Poetry, and Harper's.
In the 1960s and 1970s, Carrier published translations of the works three classical Roman writers: the playwright Terence, and the poets Propertius and Tibullus.

The anniversary of her 100th birthday was celebrated in New Britain, Connecticut.

Awards
 The Middle Voice won the 1954 Lamont Prize, given by the Academy of American Poets.
 The Golden Rose Award from the New England Poetry Club

Works

Poetry

Translations

Anthologies

References

External links
 
 New Britain, Arlene C. Palmer, p.32
 Constance Carrier Papers in the Mortimer Rare Book Collection, Smith College Special Collections

Smith College alumni
20th-century American poets
Writers from Hartford, Connecticut
1908 births
1991 deaths
Latin–English translators
American women poets
20th-century American women writers
20th-century American translators
Poets from Connecticut